The Carr ministry (2003–2005) or Fourth Carr ministry was the 88th ministry of the New South Wales Government, and was led by the 39th Premier of New South Wales, Bob Carr, representing the Labor Party.

The ministry covered the period from 2 April 2003, when Carr led Labor to victory at the 2003 state election, until 3 August 2005, when Carr resigned as Leader of the Labor Party in New South Wales and hence, as Premier. Carr was succeeded by Morris Iemma.

Composition of ministry
The first arrangement covered the period from 2 April 2003 until 3 May 2004, when there was a minor reconfiguration of the ministry.

The second arrangement covered the period from 3 May 2004, inclusive of minor changes in July and August, until 21 January 2005, when Michael Egan resigned from the ministry, resulting in a major reconfiguration of the ministry. Egan resigned from parliament a few days later.

The third arrangement covered the period from 21 January 2005, when Michael Egan resigned from the ministry, and includes a minor reconfiguration on 1 February 2005, until 3 August 2005 when the ministry was dissolved following the resignations of both Bob Carr and his deputy, Andrew Refshauge. Craig Knowles, once considered a strong candidate to succeed Carr as premier, resigned from the ministry the same day and resigned from parliament a few days later.

 
Ministers are members of the Legislative Assembly unless otherwise noted.

See also

 Members of the New South Wales Legislative Assembly, 2003–2007
Members of the New South Wales Legislative Council, 2003–2007

Notes

References

 

! colspan=3 style="border-top: 5px solid #cccccc" | New South Wales government ministries

New South Wales ministries
2003 establishments in Australia
2005 disestablishments in Australia
Australian Labor Party ministries in New South Wales